The tawny-chested flycatcher (Aphanotriccus capitalis) or Salvin's flycatcher, is a small passerine bird in the tyrant flycatcher family. It breeds in Caribbean lowlands and foothills up to 1000 m altitude from eastern Nicaragua to northern Costa Rica, although all Nicaraguan records are historical specimens collected near Lake Nicaragua or its outflow.

It is an uncommon inhabitant of mature evergreen forest and tall secondary growth, usually in dense understory vegetation on the woodland edges, along streams, in natural clearings, or in cacao plantations. The nest is built by the female in a natural cavity or a woodpecker hole in a tree or bamboo up to 6 m above the ground. The eggs are undescribed, but tyrant flycatchers typically lay two eggs which are incubated by the female for 15–16 days to hatching,

The tawny-chested flycatcher is 12 cm long, weighs 7 g and looks like a colourful Empidonax flycatcher in size and structure . It has a grey head with a white throat and white spectacles. The upperparts are olive-green, and the wings are dusky with two bright ochre wing bars and ochre edging to the secondary feathers. The breast is ochre-orange, becoming bright yellow on the belly. Sexes are similar, but females may have an olive tint to the grey head.

The tawny-chested flycatcher is seen alone or in pairs, and follows a regular route seeking insects, especially beetles and ants, picked from the underside of foliage in flight.

This species has a rapid  call.  It sometimes fans and closes its tail nervously.

Logging, conversion to banana plantations and cattle-ranch expansion have resulted in widespread forest clearance and severe fragmentation, particularly in Costa Rica. This species’ small range and intolerance of forest fragmentation suggest that it is declining, although more research is needed.

The crevice nesting habit may aid in the conservation of the species since the introduced Guadua bamboo is widely planted to support banana trees on plantations.

References

 Stiles and Skutch,  A guide to the birds of Costa Rica, 
 Young and Zook,  Nesting of Four Poorly-Known Bird Species on the Caribbean Slope of Costa Rica, Wilson Bull., 11 l(l), 1999, pp. 124–128

External links
 BirdLife Species Factsheet.
 Photograph

tawny-chested flycatcher
Birds of Costa Rica
tawny-chested flycatcher
tawny-chested flycatcher